Vagaro is a Dublin, California-based software-as-a-service business management platform and online marketplace for the wellness industry. The company's services include appointment booking, calendaring, client management, marketing, reporting, payroll, inventory management, and payment acceptance solutions.

History
Vagaro was founded by Fred Helou in 2009.

In 2018, Vagaro raised $63 million in a growth-equity round led by FTV Capital.

In 2021, Vagaro raised another round of funding from FTV Capital for an undisclosed amount at a $1 billion valuation.

References

2009 establishments in California
Internet properties established in 2009
Multinational companies headquartered in the United States
Online companies of the United States
Privately held companies of the United States
Web service providers
American companies established in 2009